William McInnes (born 1964) is an Australian actor.

William McInnes may also refer to:
William Wallace Burns McInnes (1871–1954), Canadian politician
William Beckwith McInnes (1889–1939), Australian artist
William C. McInnes (1923–2009), American university president, 1964–1973

See also
William Joseph McInnes Botanic Garden and Campus Arboretum, Mills College, California, USA